Neocurtimorda rufipalpis is a species of beetle in the genus Neocurtimorda of the family Mordellidae.

References

Beetles described in 1953
Mordellidae